Dąbrowski or Dabrowski may refer to:
Dąbrowski (or Dabrowski), a Polish surname (see that page for a list of people with that surname)
Jan Henryk Dąbrowski (1755–1818), Polish general and national hero, after whom the Polish national anthem is named
Jarosław Dąbrowski (1836–1871), Polish nobleman, Russian Army military officer, French Communard military officer during the Paris Commune
Dabrowski Battalion (1936–1938), later Dąbrowski's International Brigade, part of the International Brigades in the Spanish Civil War
Dąbrowa County (powiat dąbrowski), a Polish administrative area

See also
Dąbrowski's Mazurka, or "Poland Is Not Yet Lost", the Polish national anthem
Dembowski (disambiguation)
Dobrovsky (disambiguation)
Dubrovsky (disambiguation)